Robert M. (Bobby) Pestronk is the former Executive Director and a past president of the National Association of County and City Health Officials (NACCHO).

Career
As the former Health Officer for Genesee County, Michigan, Pestronk enabled Genesee County's 430,000 citizens to protect, promote, and improve their quality of life in partnership with community resources. As the director of the Genesee County Health Department he administered clinical, regulatory, and other human service programs in the areas of personal, community, behavioral, and environmental health.

Pestronk is a past board member of the Michigan Health Officers Association (of which he is a past president) and currently serves on the Board of the Michigan Association for Local Public Health. He is a Primary Care Policy Fellow through the United States Department of Health and Human Services and trained as a scholar through the Public Health Leadership Institute. He is past president of the Primary Care Fellowship Society] and past president of the Public Health Leadership Society Council. He was a member of the Institute of Medicine Public Health Roundtable and of the National Advisory Committee for Turning Point: Collaborating for a New Century of Public Health. He was the first president of the Public Health Law Association. Pestronk received the John H. Romani Outstanding Alumni Award from the University of Michigan School of Public Health Department of Public Health Policy and Administration and was presented the Distinguished Alumnus Award by the University of Michigan School of Public Health.

Writing
Pestronk's published work includes articles in the Journal of Public Health Management and Practice, the Journal of Law, Medicine & Ethics, the Journal of the American Public Health Association, Health Education and Behavior, Public Health Reports, and the Journal of the American Academy of Nurse Practitioners. Chapters in books include those published by the American Public Health Association and Oxford University Press.

References

 http://www.publichealthsystems.org/pbrn/PBRNCoordinatingCenter/NationalAdvisoryCommittee/RobertPestronk
 http://www.naccho.org

External links
  Editorial: Government should own up to lack of flu preparedness
 US, other nations stop counting pandemic flu cases
  Public Faces Long Wait to Get New Flu Vaccine
  Diane Reim Show on H1N1 Vaccine

Living people
University of Michigan School of Public Health alumni
Year of birth missing (living people)